Newsome is an unincorporated community in Camp County, in the U.S. state of Texas. According to the Handbook of Texas, the community had a population of 100 in 2000.

History
The Newsome area was first settled in the 1860s and grew up around a railroad switch station that was established in 1887. It was named for local settler John Newsome. A post office was established at Newsome in 1902 and remained in operation until 1972. John M. Newsome was the postmaster. The community had a population of 450 in 1914 and its businesses consisted of a bank, a picture show, a hotel, a garage with two car salesmen, a newspaper titled the Newsome Argus, and several stores. Because of its location in an agricultural and lumbering area, Newsome served as a shipping and supply point for lumberjacks and farmers who lived in the community. A tornado hit the community in April 1919 that killed at least 8 people, but it never recovered from it. Its population plunged to 165 by 1929 but grew to 200 when it gained ten businesses in 1931 and then lost half of its population in 1968. Its population remained at 100 from 1972 through 2000. Its businesses disappeared in 1988. Newsome's population was estimated as 113 in 2019.

Geography

Education
Newsome is served by the Pittsburg Independent School District.

References

Unincorporated communities in Camp County, Texas
Unincorporated communities in Texas